Graeme Richard Hart (born 1955) is a New Zealand billionaire businessman and the country's wealthiest person. He prefers to stay out of the media and makes few public appearances. As of March 2022, his net worth was estimated at US$9.7 billion.

Much like other leveraged buyout (LBO) private equity investors, Hart has a preference for buying underperforming and undervalued companies with steady cash flows which can be turned around through better cash management, cost-cutting and restructuring with other businesses. Since his 2006 purchase of Carter Holt Harvey he has focused his acquisitions on the paper packaging sector. His largest acquisition to-date was for Alcoa's Packaging & Consumer group in 2008 for US$2.7bn, later renamed Reynolds Packaging Group. He does not directly manage his businesses, and is focused mostly on the financing related to re-capitalization of the companies.

Forbes stated that Hart was the 274th richest person in the world as of March 2022. In 2022, Hart was inducted into the New Zealand Business Hall of Fame.

Early years 
Hart worked as a tow-truck driver and as a panel beater after leaving school at 16. He attended Mount Roskill Grammar School, located in the central suburbs of Auckland, New Zealand.

In 1987, Hart completed an MBA from the University of Otago. His research thesis, as part of the MBA, outlined his strategy to grow Rank Group Limited, at the time a small "party hire" company servicing the greater Auckland area.  The strategy Hart outlined in this thesis uses the positive cashflow of well-performing companies to fund debt, which as it gets paid down, increases the equity value of the initial investors.

Hart gained a big break when he purchased the Government Printing Office for less than its capital value in 1990. The purchase was 1.4x earnings and Hart was provided generous payment terms. Then New Zealand Prime Minister David Lange initially refused to sign off on the transaction. The following year he bought Whitcoulls Group which at that time included a retail chain of bookstores as well as office and stationery concerns. He has since sold off these interests.

Current interests

Rank Group 

Rank Group Ltd is Hart's private investment company. It is the 100% owner of Reynolds Consumer Products, Burns Philp and Carter Holt Harvey. Rank had assets of approximately NZ$3 billion in cash after selling the assets of Burns Philp and floating Goodman Fielder in 2004.

In December 2006 he agreed to purchase International Paper's drinks packaging business Evergreen Packaging for NZ$725 million. In May 2007 he bought Swiss packaging company SIG for NZ$3.2 billion. The SIG division Combibloc is the second largest food and drink carton packaging company in the world after Swedish giant Tetra Laval. In August 2007 Hart completed his US$450 million purchase of US paper packaging company Blue Ridge Paper Products of North Carolina which he intends to merge with Evergreen Packaging of Arkansas. These acquisitions make Rank Group the world's second biggest company in the paper products business.

In March 2015 Reynolds Group Holdings completed the sale of SIG to Onex Corporation.

Hart's company vehicle is a Gulfstream G650-ER, registered N946JB.

Burns Philp 
Burns Philp and Company Limited was an Australian and New Zealand food manufacturing company dual listed on the ASX and NZX.  Hart has been the chairman since September 2004 and a member of the board of directors since September 1997. In 2003 Burns Philp performed a A$2.4 billion hostile takeover of the much larger food group Goodman Fielder before relisting it through an IPO.

Following the sale of its yeast and spices business to UK firm Associated British Foods, Uncle Toby's to Nestle for NZ$1.1 billion and Bluebird Foods to PepsiCo for NZ$245 million the company became largely a cashed up shell.

In December 2006, Hart completed a AU$1.6 billion takeover of the 42 per cent of Burns Philp he did not already own. After the successful takeover Burns Philp was delisted from the ASX and NZX. The deal gave him total control of A$2.9 billion of Burns Philp cash, net of debt, which he could then use to further build on his Carter Holt Harvey empire.

Hart sold Burn Philp's 20% stake in Goodman Fielder for NZ$675.8 million in October 2007.

Carter Holt Harvey 
In 2006 Hart paid NZ$3.3 billion for Carter Holt Harvey (CHH), a New Zealand timber and paper business. Soon after completing the purchase he began restructuring the struggling company starting with the sale of CHH's forests to US-based Hancock Timber Group for up to NZ$2 billion. Hart has also sold CHH's head office property, various sawmills and packaging plants for over NZ$300 million.
 
In 2007 he announced the sale of CHH's building supplies business which some estimate could fetch NZ$2.3bn, but was unsuccessful in the selling of it.

Hart had also been seeking a purchaser for the packaging side of CHH since October 2010. In April 2014, CHH announced the sale of its Pulp, Paper & Packaging business to a Japanese consortium for NZ$1.037 billion, with the deal closing in the second half of 2014.

Reynolds Packaging Group 
In 2008 Hart paid US$2.7 billion for Alcoa (AA) Packaging & Consumer group. He spun off the company and renamed it Reynolds Packaging Group, which is now headquartered in Lake Forest, Illinois, USA.  While this business is within the packaging industry, it is not paper packaging related, being mostly in the aluminium foil and plastic closure business. Since the purchase from Alcoa, Hart has cut more than 20% of the workforce within Reynolds, mostly through plant shutdowns, including the flagship Reynolds Wrap Foil Plant in Richmond, Virginia and restructuring efforts. This has resulted in significant savings and profit margin jump for the company, allowing him to issue more debt on behalf of the company in October 2009 and get a high return on his initial investment.

In November 2009 and May 2010, Hart, through additional debt financing has combined the packaging groups he owns into Reynolds Group Holdings Limited. RGHL is the combination of four operating segments: SIG (a beverage packaging manufacturer headquartered in Zurich), Closure Systems International (a plastic bottle cap manufacturer headquartered in Indianapolis), Evergreen Packaging (a beverage packaging manufacturer headquartered in Memphis), and Reynolds Consumer Products (an aluminium foil and other packaging materials manufacturer) located in Lake Forest, Illinois. While the operations are spread around the world, the RGHL corporate headquarters are located in the same office building as Reynolds Consumer Products in Lake Forest, Illinois.

On 17 June 2011, Reynolds Group Holdings announced its intention to acquire all of the outstanding stock of Graham Packaging Company, Inc, headquartered in York, Pennsylvania. 
The acquisition was completed on 8 September 2011 for $25.50 per share (in cash), for a total enterprise value, including net debt, of approximately US$4.5 billion.
This acquisition increased Rank's growing profile in the US. Earlier in 2011, it agreed to buy the automotive consumer business of Honeywell International (the FRAM group) for US$950 million.
In March 2015 Reynolds Group Holdings completed the sale of SIG to Onex Corporation.

Walter & Wild 
Since 2018, Hart and his son Harry have been the majority shareholders in Walter & Wild, a holding company specialising in New Zealand food brands including Alfa One, Aunt Betty's, Greggs, Hansells, Hubbard Foods, Thriftee, Teza and Vitafresh.

Personal life
Graeme Hart has multiple residences in New Zealand, including in Auckland, Queenstown, and Waiheke Island. Hart also owns an island in Fiji, as well as two properties in Aspen, Colorado in the US. 

Hart says he lacks interest in making money for its own sake. He describes his personal wealth as a "by-product" of what he does.

While Hart prefers to keep a low profile in the general media, he was notable for the launch of his 58 metre (190') luxury motor yacht Ulysses at Auckland's Viaduct Harbour in January 2006. The yacht was valued at nearly $100 million and took five years to complete due to it being gutted by a fire during refit at a New Orleans shipyard. In 2012 the Ulysses was put up for sale for $49-million.

This yacht will be particularly well suited to sail under off-shore rough conditions something the Kleven Verft ship yard specialises in. The yacht will also include a helicopter deck, a hangar, and accommodation for up to 60 persons.
Hart's latest 107-metre (351') "expedition yacht," formerly named Ulysses, was completed and eventually launched on 3 September 2014, in Ulsteinvik, north of Oslo, at the Kleven Verft shipyard.

In 2017 it was reported that he purchased a new 116 metre (380') explorer yacht, which was named "Ulysses", after his 107 metre (351') yacht, formerly of the same name, had been sold.

In December 2018, the Hart Family made a $10m donation to the University of Otago to go towards opening their $28.2m dental teaching facility in South Auckland.

In February 2022, Hart donated eight tractors, 30 fishing boats and a container full of breakfast food to the people of Tonga following the 2022 Hunga Tonga–Hunga Ha'apai eruption and tsunami.

Hart donated over $58,000 to the mayoral campaign of Wayne Brown in the 2022 local body elections. He has also made donations to the New Zealand First and ACT parties.

References

External links 
Reynolds Packaging

 1955 births
 Living people
 People educated at Mount Roskill Grammar School
 New Zealand businesspeople
 University of Otago alumni
 New Zealand billionaires